List by Family Name: A - B - C - D - E - F - G - H - I - J - K - M - N - O - R - S - T - U - W - Y - Z
 Oda Sakunosuke (October 26, 1913 – January 10, 1947)
 Oe Kenzaburo (born January 31, 1935)
 Ogawa Yoko (born 1962)
 Ogiwara Seisensui (1884–1976)
 Oguri Mushitaro (March 14, 1901 – February 10, 1946)
 Okakura Kakuzo (December 26, 1862 – September 2, 1913)
 Okamoto Kanoko (March 1, 1889 – February 18, 1939)
 Okamoto Kido (October 15, 1872 – March 1, 1939)
 Ono Fuyumi (born 1960)
 Ono no Komachi (c. 825 – c. 900)
 Ooka Makoto (1931–2017)
 Ooka Shohei (March 6, 1909 – December 25, 1988)
 Orikuchi Shinobu (February 11, 1887 – September 3, 1953)
 Osanai Kaoru (July 26, 1881 – December 25, 1928)
 Oshikawa Shunro (March 21, 1876 – November 16, 1914)
 Ota Mizuho (1872–1963)
 Otomo no Yakamochi (c. 718 – 785)
 Ozaki Hosai (January 20, 1885 – April 7, 1926)
 Ozaki Kihachi (1892–1974)
 Ozaki Koyo (January 10, 1867 – October 30, 1903)
 Ozu Yasujiro (1903–1963)

O